This is a list of the members (academicians) of the Chinese Academy of Engineering (CAE). CAE academician is the highest academic title officially recognized by the Chinese government in engineering and technological sciences.

As of January 2023, the academy has 920 living members, divided into nine academic divisions:

 Mechanical and Vehicle Engineering: 128 members
 Information and Electronic Engineering: 133 members
 Chemical, Metallurgical and Materials Engineering: 113 members
 Energy and Mining Engineering: 124 members
 Civil and Hydraulic Engineering and Architecture: 102 members
 Light Industry and Environmental Engineering: 67 members
 Agriculture: 86 members
 Medicine and Health: 125 members
 Engineering Management: 28 members

There are 306 deceased members as of January 2023. Additionally, there are 111 living foreign members and 19 deceased ones.

Eligibility and election process
As of 2019, official rules of the Chinese Academy of Engineering stipulate that elections are held every two years in odd-numbered years. Academicians younger than 80 in the election year have the right to nominate a maximum of three candidates and vote for new academicians. Candidates may be nominated by academicians or academic organizations. Each candidate needs three nominations to qualify, at least two of which must be from academicians in the same division as the candidate. In principle, candidates should be younger than 65, but older candidates may still qualify if they receive six nominations. Government officials holding county-level positions or higher are in principle not eligible. Candidates involved in national defence and security are nominated and elected separately. The number of academicians elected varies each time. In the 2019 election, the quota was set at a maximum of 80.

The Chinese Academy of Engineering began electing foreign members in 1996. The number of foreign members have been kept relatively small, totalling 82 by 2017. As of 2017, 58% of foreign members are American and 33% are of Chinese origin. Well known foreign members include Nobel Prize laureates Barry Marshall and Satoshi Ōmura, Microsoft co-founder Bill Gates, Turing Award winner Raj Reddy, and Pritzker Architecture Prize laureate I. M. Pei.

Founding members (1994)
During preparation for the founding of the Chinese Academy of Engineering, the State Council of China announced the first class of 96 academicians in May 1994:

1995 election
216 new members were elected to the Chinese Academy of Engineering in 1995, separated into seven academic divisions:

Mechanical and Vehicle Engineering

Information and Electronic Engineering

Chemical, Metallurgical and Materials Engineering

Energy and Mining

Civil and Hydraulic Engineering and Architecture

Agriculture, Light Industry and Environmental Engineering

Medicine and Health

1996 election
In 1996, 20 new members were elected to the Chinese Academy of Engineering. In addition, seven foreign members were elected for the first time:

Members

Foreign members

1997 election
In 1997, 116 new members were elected to the Chinese Academy of Engineering. 5 foreign members were elected the following year.

Mechanical and Vehicle Engineering

Information and Electronic Engineering

Chemical, Metallurgical and Materials Engineering

Energy and Mining

Civil and Hydraulic Engineering and Architecture

Agriculture, Light Industry and Environmental Engineering

Medicine and Health

Foreign members (elected 1998)

1999 election
In 1999, 112 new members were elected to the Chinese Academy of Engineering. 6 foreign members were elected the following year.

Mechanical and Vehicle Engineering

Information and Electronic Engineering

Chemical, Metallurgical and Materials Engineering

Energy and Mining

Civil and Hydraulic Engineering and Architecture

Agriculture, Light Industry and Environmental Engineering

Medicine and Health

Foreign members (elected 2000)

2001 election
In 2001, 81 new members were elected to the Chinese Academy of Engineering, separated into eight academic divisions (the Division of Engineering Management was added this year). In addition, 7 foreign members were elected.

Mechanical and Vehicle Engineering

Information and Electronic Engineering

Chemical, Metallurgical and Materials Engineering

Energy and Mining

Civil and Hydraulic Engineering and Architecture

Agriculture, Light Industry and Environmental Engineering

Medicine and Health

Engineering Management

Foreign members

2003 election
In 2003, 58 new members were elected to the Chinese Academy of Engineering, as well as 4 foreign members.

Mechanical and Vehicle Engineering

Information and Electronic Engineering

Chemical, Metallurgical and Materials Engineering

Energy and Mining

Civil and Hydraulic Engineering and Architecture

Agriculture, Light Industry and Environmental Engineering

Medicine and Health

Engineering Management

Foreign members

2005 election
In 2005, 50 new members were elected to the Chinese Academy of Engineering, as well as 6 foreign members.

Mechanical and Vehicle Engineering

Information and Electronic Engineering

Chemical, Metallurgical and Materials Engineering

Energy and Mining

Civil and Hydraulic Engineering and Architecture

Agriculture, Light Industry and Environmental Engineering

Medicine and Health

Engineering Management

Foreign members

2007 election
In 2007, 32 new members were elected to the Chinese Academy of Engineering, divided into 9 academic divisions (Agriculture was separated from Light Industry and Environmental Engineering). In addition, 3 foreign members were elected.

Mechanical and Vehicle Engineering

Information and Electronic Engineering

Chemical, Metallurgical and Materials Engineering

Energy and Mining

Civil and Hydraulic Engineering and Architecture

Light Industry and Environmental Engineering

Agriculture

Medicine and Health

Engineering Management

Foreign members

2009 election
In 2009, 47 new members were elected to the Chinese Academy of Engineering, as well as 6 foreign members.

Mechanical and Vehicle Engineering

Information and Electronic Engineering

Chemical, Metallurgical and Materials Engineering

Energy and Mining

Civil and Hydraulic Engineering and Architecture

Light Industry and Environmental Engineering

Agriculture

Medicine and Health

Engineering Management

Foreign members

2011 election
In 2011, 54 new members were elected to the Chinese Academy of Engineering, as well as 6 foreign members.

Mechanical and Vehicle Engineering

Information and Electronic Engineering

Chemical, Metallurgical and Materials Engineering

Energy and Mining

Civil and Hydraulic Engineering and Architecture

Light Industry and Environmental Engineering

Agriculture

Medicine and Health

Engineering Management

Foreign members

2013 election
In 2013, 51 new members were elected to the Chinese Academy of Engineering, as well as 6 foreign members.

Mechanical and Vehicle Engineering

Information and Electronic Engineering

 Chemical, Metallurgical and Materials Engineering

 Energy and Mining

Civil and Hydraulic Engineering and Architecture

Light Industry and Environmental Engineering

Agriculture

Medicine and Health

Engineering Management

Foreign members

2015 election
In 2015, 70 new members were elected to the Chinese Academy of Engineering, as well as 8 foreign members.

Mechanical and Vehicle Engineering

Information and Electronic Engineering

Chemical, Metallurgical and Materials Engineering

Energy and Mining

 Civil and Hydraulic Engineering and Architecture

Light Industry and Environmental Engineering

Agriculture

Medicine and Health

Engineering Management

Foreign members

2017 election
In 2017, 67 new members were elected to the Chinese Academy of Engineering, as well as 18 foreign members.

Mechanical and Vehicle Engineering

Information and Electronic Engineering

Chemical, Metallurgical and Materials Engineering

Energy and Mining

Civil and Hydraulic Engineering and Architecture

Light Industry and Environmental Engineering

Agriculture

Medicine and Health

Engineering Management

Foreign members

2019 election
In 2019, 75 new members were elected to the Chinese Academy of Engineering, as well as 29 foreign members.

Mechanical and Vehicle Engineering

Information and Electronic Engineering

Chemical, Metallurgical and Materials Engineering

Energy and Mining

Civil and Hydraulic Engineering and Architecture

Light Industry and Environmental Engineering

Agriculture

Medicine and Health

Engineering Management

Foreign members

References